Natalie Rothstein (21 June 1930 – 18 February 2010) was a curator and academic. She held the post of curator of silks at the Victoria and Albert Museum, having worked there for 38 years. She also wrote and edited numerous works on textiles including 400 Years of Fashion (1988).

References

1930 births
2010 deaths
British curators
People associated with the Victoria and Albert Museum